Dave's Room, previously known as Mama Jo's Recording Studio, is a recording studio in North Hollywood, California.

History
Dave's Room was built in the late 1960s by producer, and engineer Freddie Piro. Originally called Mama Jo's, the studio was the first independent recording studio in North Hollywood, California. Albums by artists such as Richie Furay, Keith Green, Billy Joel, Pat Benatar, Amy Grant, Sam Phillips, Ambrosia, Ziggy Marley, George Michael, Love Song, Michael W. Smith, Margaret Becker, BeBe and CeCe Winans, Andraé Crouch and the Disciples, Blink 182, Chuck Girard, The Way, Smokey Robinson, Randy Stonehill, Sweet Comfort Band and Daniel Amos were recorded there.

Producers and engineers including Alan Parsons, Jack Joseph Puig, Jonathan David Brown, Al Perkins, T Bone Burnett, Andy Johns, Brown Bannister, Burt Bacharach and Larry Norman were clients during this period.

After falling into disrepair in the mid-2000s, in 2006 it was completely refurbished by David Bianco. Bianco restored the recording space with an eye toward maintaining the incredible period feel, and acoustics.  The control room, originally designed by Vincent Van Haaff, was updated technically. The main speakers were re-built using matching components from another Van Haaff-designed room at Larrabee Sound Studios, and was re-named Dave's Room.

Albums by Lucinda Williams, Blues Traveler, Bob Dylan, Big Head Todd and the Monsters, Trombone Shorty, Exene Cervenka, Meghan Trainor, Bettye LaVette, Tift Merritt, Susan Tedeschi and Judith Owen were recorded there. Along with soundtrack music for The Muppets, Blades of Glory and Gangster Squad.

After Bianco's death, in June 2018 the studio was taken over by his longtime friends, and colleagues David Spreng and Paul "Fig" Figueroa with the support of the Bianco family.

Selected albums recorded at Mama Jo's

 Final Touch, Love Song, 1974
 Ambrosia, Ambrosia, 1975
 Can It Be?, The Way, 1975
 Take Me Back, Andraé Crouch and The Disciples, 1975
 Daniel Amos, Daniel Amos, 1976
 In Another Land, Larry Norman, 1976
 Welcome to Paradise, Randy Stonehill, 1976
 Tales of Mystery and Imagination, Alan Parsons, 1976
 Barefoot Ballet, John Klemmer, 1976
 View from the Bridge, Tom Howard, 1977
 Seasons of Change, Richie Furay, 1982
 A Call To Us All, Teri Desario, 1983
 Caught in the Act of Loving Him, Servant, 1983
 Beat the System, Petra, 1984

References

External links
 

Recording studios in California
Buildings and structures completed in 1970
1970 establishments in California